Cytologia is a peer-reviewed scientific journal covering all aspects of botany. It was established in 1929. According to the Journal Citation Reports, the journal has a 2016 impact factor of 0.913.

References

Botany journals